Connie Renea Kunzmann (July 3, 1956 – February 7, 1981) was a professional basketball player who was a member of the Iowa Cornets and the Nebraska Wranglers in the Women's Professional Basketball League (WBL) from 1978 to 1981. Kunzmann made the transition from halfcourt six-on-six basketball in high school to the traditional five-on-five full court game in college and the pros. She attended Wayne State College in Wayne, Nebraska, where she played on the school's basketball and softball teams. In 1978, she signed with the Iowa Cornets of the newly-formed WBL, which was the first women's professional basketball league in the United States. 

Kunzmann was killed on February 7, 1981, by Lance Tibke, who later pleaded guilty to second degree murder. He was sentenced to 10 to 40 years in prison, but was paroled after serving less than nine years. Kunzmann's team, the Nebraska Wranglers, canceled their game on February 10 when investigators disclosed that she had been killed. They returned to the court a day later donning black bands on their uniforms in memory of Kunzmann. The Wranglers went on to win the WBL Championship. Kunzmann's death was a national news story – with reports being filed regularly during the search for her body, which was hindered for nearly a week by poor weather conditions. Her remains were located in the Missouri River on March 28, halfway between Dodge Park and the Mormon Bridge. An autopsy concluded the cause of death was blunt force trauma to the head by an object, likely a tire iron. Kunzmann was interred at Lone Tree Cemetery in Everly.

Early life
Kunzmann was born on July 3, 1956, in Spencer, Iowa, to Ray and Elanor Kunzmann. The family later moved to Moneta, Iowa. Kunzamnn's father died during her childhood, which according to her mother, caused Connie to consume herself in basketball.

Kunzmann attended Everly High School in Everly, Iowa. She played on the school's six-on-six basketball team from 1971 to 1974. During her sophomore season, Kunzmann led the all state six-on-six players in steals. She was named The Des Moines Register All-Iowa Second Team following her junior season. After playing her first three seasons at guard, Everly's principal Larry Johnson suggested she switch to forward. She led her team in scoring that season with 34 points per game. She was named to the Sioux City Journal All-Northwest Iowa First Team, the Iowa Daily Press Association All-Iowa Third Team and The Des Moines Register All-Iowa Sixth Team.

After graduating high school, Kunzmann enrolled at Wayne State College in Wayne, Nebraska. She played for the Wildcats women's basketball and softball teams. On February 3, 1975, she scored 33 points in a basketball game against the Midland University Warriors. Her points total set a team record for most scored in a single game. She set the record again, with 40 points, during a game on December 6, 1975. She also had 15 rebounds in that game. Norma Boetel, the South Dakota State Jackrabbits women's basketball head coach, said of Kuzmann in 1976, "Wayne [State] is led by Connie Kunzmann, a tall, mobile gal who shoots well, rebounds well and plays fine defense." Kunzmann finished the 1975–76 season with an average of a 20.1 points and 14.4 rebounds per game.

Kunzmann broke her ankle sliding into third base during a Wildcats softball game against the Nebraska Cornhuskers on April 2, 1976. She recovered from her injury in time for the basketball season. On December 30, 1976, she scored 37 points, leading the Wildcats to of 79–69 victory over the Northern Colorado Bears in the championship game of the Chadron State College Holiday Tournament. Her junior year, Kunzmann was named Wayne State College Athlete of the Year and was named First Team All-Nebraska College Conference in basketball. She averaged 20.4 points and 13.3 rebounds per game during the 1976–77 season. Kunzmann is the career leader for Wayne State in rebounds, with 1,271.

Professional career
Kunzmann signed with the Iowa Cornets of the fledgling Women's Professional Basketball League (WBL) in 1978. Her professional debut came on December 1 in a preseason game against the Chicago Hustle. She went 6-for-6 from the field and 2-for-2 from the free throw line, finishing the game with 14 points in the Cornets 114–105 victory. She made the Cornets' starting lineup during their regular season opener on December 15, against the Minnesota Fillies. Along with other members of the Cornets, Kunzman appeared in the 1979 film Scoring, which starred Pete Maravich.

Kunzmann and other Cornets staff and players reported that payroll checks issued to them on March 1, 1980 bounced. The team eventually made good on their payments. The Cornets made it to the WBL Championship Series in 1980, but lost to the New York Stars. In the deciding fourth game of the series, Kunzmann scored 20 points and grabbed 12 rebounds. At the end of the season, the Cornets held a banquet at Falbo's Restaurant in Des Moines. Kunzmann was awarded the team's "hustle award". During the off-season, Kunzmann coached a girl's six-on-six basketball camp in Cedar Rapids along with teammates Molly Bolin, Tanya Crevier and Nancy Wellen. 

The Corents went through a tumultuous off-season as players and staff publicly aired their grievances against the team's general manager, Rod Lein. The Cornets head coach, Steve Kirk, and two other staff members resigned because they did not want to work under Lien. He eventually resigned as general manager, but not before Kunzmann announced her intention to follow Kirk to his new team, the Nebraska Wranglers. She started the 1980–81 season coming off the bench for the Wranglers.

Following her death in 1981, the WBL named an award after Kunzmann. Sybil Blalock of the New Orleans Pride won the inaugural Connie Kunzmann Hustle and Harmony Award.

Death and subsequent events
Kunzmann was reported missing by a coach for her team, the Nebraska Wranglers, on February 7, 1981. She was last seen the night before at Tiger Tom's Bar in Omaha. Police were soon investigating her disappearance as a homicide. An arrest warrant was issued for Lance Edward Tibke, who was with Kunzmann at the bar the night she disappeared. Absent a body, police asserted that Tibke took Kunzmann to Dodge Park, where the two got into an argument that led to her murder. Police believed her body was dumped in the Missouri River. Tibke turned himself in to police and confessed that he killed Kunzmann, but claimed it was in self-defense. He was charged with second degree murder. At his arraignment, Tibke waived his right to a preliminary hearing and his bond was set at $15,000, which was posted. The Associated Press article on Kunzmann's death was published in a number of newspapers across the United States.

The Nebraska Wranglers postponed a game they were scheduled to play on February 10 against the Chicago Hustle. The team released the following statement:

The Wranglers returned to the court on February 12, donning black arm bands on their jerseys in memory of Kunzmann. The team went on to win the WBL Championship that season. In 2010, Holly Warlick was asked about Kunzmann's death. The two played for the Wranglers and shared a room in Omaha. Warling said:

Nebraska State Patrol utilized a helicopter and diving unit in the search for Kunzmann's body. The search was called off on February 11 due to freezing temperatures and floating ice chunks in the river. They resumed the search of February 17, but the Douglas County Sheriffs Department announced that if her body was not found by the end of the day the search would be permanently suspended. Police announced the following day they had discovered a blood stained jacket, believed to be Kunzmann's, at the Springwell Cemetery. After the police ended their search for Kunzmann, her family turned to psychic Greta Alexander for help.

Kunzmann's funeral service was held on March 6 at Hope Lutheran Church in Everly, Iowa. On March 28, her body was found snagged on a fallen branch in the Missouri River by two teenage brothers. The body was located midway between the Mormon Bridge and Dodge Park. An autopsy was performed by Dr. Jerry Jones, which determined the cause of death was blunt force trauma, likely caused by a tire iron. The body also had numerous stab wounds, which Jones concluded did not lead to Kunzmann's death. On April 2, a grave-side service for Kunzmann was held at Lone Tree Cemetery in Everly. Her headstone reads, "Gone to be an angel [...] The world was better because you lived." It also features a cross, a smiley face and a silhouette of Kunzmann playing basketball with "W.B.L Pro #44" etched under it. 

Tibke's defense attorney filed a motion to make his confession inadmissible, but they were unsuccessful. Evidence emerged that three police officers responded to Tibke's house the night after the murder at the request of his father, Edward Tibke, who was a member of the Omaha Police Department. On June 16, Tibke entered a guilty plea to the second degree murder charge and was taken back into police custody. He was sentenced to 10 to 40 years in prison on July 10 by Douglas County District Judge Paul Hickman. During an interview  with sports columnist Ira Berkow in 1982, Tibke was asked about Kunzmann's murder, stating, "I began to pound her and pound her. She said, 'Stop it, stop it, stop it. Please don't.' But I couldn't stop. I don't know why. She was a nice girl. I didn't have anything against her." Tibke was paroled from the Nebraska State Penitentiary on June 25, 1990, after serving only nine years of his sentence. 

In 1986, Kunzmann was posthumously inducted into the Wayne State College Athletic Hall of Fame. Every WBL player, including Kunzmann, was inducted into the  Women's Basketball Hall of Fame "Trailblazers of the Game" wing in 2018.

Notes

See also
 List of basketball players who died during their careers

1956 births
1981 deaths
1981 murders in the United States
American murder victims
American women's basketball players
Basketball players from Iowa
Deaths by beating in the United States
Female murder victims
People from Spencer, Iowa
People murdered in Nebraska
Wayne State Wildcats athletes
Women's Professional Basketball League players